The 179th Pennsylvania House of Representatives District is located in Philadelphia County and includes the following areas:

 Ward 23 [PART, Divisions 02, 05, 06, 07, 10, 11, 12, 15, 16, 17, 18, 19, 20, 21, 22 and 23]
 Ward 35 [PART, Divisions 15, 23, 24, 26, 29 and 30]
 Ward 41 [PART, Divisions 01, 02 and 03]
 Ward 42 [PART, Divisions 12, 13, 14, 15, 16, 17, 18, 19, 20, 21, 24 and 25]
 Ward 53 [PART, Division 01]
 Ward 54 [PART, Division 01]
 Ward 61 [PART, Divisions 01, 02, 03 and 07]
 Ward 62 [PART, Divisions 01, 02, 03, 04, 05, 06, 07, 08, 09, 10, 11, 12, 14 and 19]

Representatives

References

Government of Philadelphia
179